Poduri may refer to several places in Romania:

Poduri, a commune in Bacău County
Poduri, a village in Câmpeni town, Alba County
Poduri, a village in Corbi Commune, Argeș County
Poduri, a village in Valea Largă Commune, Mureș County
Poduri, a village in Valea Sării Commune, Vrancea County